Bangladesh Institute of Glass and Ceramics (BIGC) is the oldest and only institute of its kind in Bangladesh. The establishment of the institute dates back to 11 March 1951 named as “East Bengal Ceramics Institute”. In 1960 the institute was renamed “East Pakistan Institute of Glass and Ceramics (EPIGC)”. In 1971 Bangladesh emerged as an independent nation from Pakistan, the institute was again renamed as “Bangladesh Institute of Glass and Ceramics” in 1972. With the growing demands of Glass and Ceramics sector of mid-level technical manpower home and abroad three years Diploma in Ceramic Engineering was introduced in the year 1978 and Diploma in Glass Engineering was introduced in the year 2000. Duration of the Glass and Ceramic Engineering Course has changed to four years from the year 2000.

History
Bangladesh Institute of Glass and Ceramics started on 11 March 1951 as East Bengal Ceramics Institute. The institute was renamed to East Pakistan Institute of Glass and Ceramics in 1960. After the Bangladesh Liberation war, the institute was renamed to its present name. It provides 4 years professional Engineering Program is under the Bangladesh Technical Education Board.

Directorates 
The institute operates under the executive control of the Ministry of Education(MOE) acting through the Directorate of Technical Education (DTE). The academic programmes and curricula are maintained under the regulation of the Bangladesh Technical Education Board (BTEB). BTEB function under Directorate of Inspection and Audit (DIA), which in turn function under Chief Accounts Office (CAO), and it function under Ministry of Education (Bangladesh).

Campus 
The main campus is a two-storied building. A large auditorium also located just in the main campus for various events and cultural activities. The southern corner has a Shaheed Minar.

Departments 
 Department of Ceramic Engineering (CE) 
 Department of Glass Engineering (GE)

Workshop 
A large well-equipped workshop is located on the main campus to enhance students' practical skills. Practical classes for Electrical, Mechanical, Chemical testing and Glass & Ceramics are frequently held in the workshop.

Hostels 
Kazi Nazrul Islam (Male) Hostel
Begum Rokeya (Female) Hostel

Scope of Higher Education 
The Diploma in Engineering graduates of this institute have opportunity for higher studies in Materials & Metallurgical Engineering and Chemical & Food Engineering Department at Dhaka University of Engineering & Technology and also related branch like ChE, IPE, ME of engineering different private universities and Associate Membership Examination (AMIE) under IEB in Bangladesh and India or other countries abroad. The graduates of this institute also have opportunity for admission in degree pass/hon's course of the public and private universities. Technical Teachers Training College (TTTC) & Islamic University of Technology (IUT)  Provides Diploma, B.Sc. PGD. & M.Sc. in pre-service teachers training program for the graduates of this institute as well as in service teachers training for the teachers of this institute.

See also
 Dhaka Polytechnic Institute
 Dhaka University of Engineering & Technology
 Rajshahi University of Engineering & Technology
 Bangladesh University of Engineering & Technology

References

External links
Official Website

1951 establishments in East Pakistan
Vocational education in Bangladesh
Organisations based in Dhaka
Universities and colleges in Dhaka
Colleges in Bangladesh
Educational institutions established in 1951
Polytechnic institutes in Bangladesh
Glass industry
Ceramics